The 2017–18 Abilene Christian Wildcats men's basketball team represented Abilene Christian University during the 2017–18 NCAA Division I men's basketball season. The Wildcats were led by seventh-year head coach Joe Golding and played their home games at the Moody Coliseum in Abilene, Texas as members of the Southland Conference. They finished the season 16–16, 8–10 in Southland play to finish in a three-way tie for eighth place. They failed to qualify for the Southland tournament. They received an invitation to the CollegeInsider.com Tournament where they lost in the first round to Drake.

The season marked the Wildcats' first full season as a Division I school after a four-year transition period from Division II to Division I.

Previous season 
The Wildcats finished the 2016–17 season 13–16, 7–11 in Southland play to finish in a five-way tie for eighth place.

The Wildcats, in their final year of a four-year transition from Division II to Division I, were not eligible for a postseason tournament including the Southland tournament, but were considered a Division I team for scheduling purposes and a Division I RPI member.

Roster

Schedule and results

|-
!colspan=9 style=| Non-conference regular season

|-
!colspan=9 style=| Southland regular season

|-
!colspan=9 style=|CIT

See also
2017–18 Abilene Christian Wildcats women's basketball team

References

Abilene Christian Wildcats men's basketball seasons
Abilene Christian
Abilene Christian Wildcats basketball
Abilene Christian Wildcats basketball
Abilene Christian